Alexandra Parade railway station is a railway station in Glasgow, Scotland. The station is managed by ScotRail.

It was built as part of the City of Glasgow Union Railway which provided a link across the Clyde (between the Glasgow and Paisley Joint Railway at Shields Junction and the Edinburgh and Glasgow Railway at Sighthill Junction).

Services 

 2tph to  via Glasgow Queen St Low Level, Yoker and 
 2tph to Springburn

On Sundays, an hourly Partick to Springburn service each way operates between 9am and 8pm.

References

Sources

External links

Railway stations in Glasgow
Former North British Railway stations
Railway stations in Great Britain opened in 1881
Railway stations in Great Britain closed in 1917
Railway stations in Great Britain opened in 1919
SPT railway stations
Railway stations served by ScotRail
1881 establishments in Scotland